Peter Gschnitzer (born 10 July 1953 in Sterzing) was an Italian luger who competed during the late 1970s and early 1980s. He won the silver medal in the men's doubles event at the 1980 Winter Olympics in Lake Placid, New York.

Gschnitzer also won a silver medal in the men's doubles event at the 1977 FIL World Luge Championships in Igls, Austria. He also won a bronze medal in the men's doubles event at the 1979 FIL European Luge Championships in Oberhof, East Germany.

Gschnitzer also won the overall Luge World Cup title in men's doubles in the first two seasons of the World Cup's existence (1977-8, 1978-9).

References

External links

 

1953 births
Italian male lugers
Living people
Lugers at the 1976 Winter Olympics
Lugers at the 1980 Winter Olympics
Olympic lugers of Italy
Olympic medalists in luge
Medalists at the 1980 Winter Olympics
Olympic silver medalists for Italy
Sportspeople from Sterzing
Lugers of Centro Sportivo Carabinieri